Joan Township is a geographic township in Temagami, Nipissing District, Northeastern Ontario, Canada, situated in the core of Lake Temagami. It covers much of Bear Island, the northern tip of Temagami Island, the Northwest Arm of Lake Temagami, Sand Point, and the Joan Peninsula.

Notes

References

Townships of Temagami